Prochola sancticola is a moth of the family Agonoxenidae. It is found on the Virgin Islands.

References

Moths described in 1932
Agonoxeninae
Moths of the Caribbean